Miguel Montaño (born June 25, 1991) is a Colombian footballer who plays for Victoria Hotspurs in Malta.

Club career
Montaño began his career in the youth ranks of Deportivo Pereira in 2006 before moving to Selección Palmira the following season. In 2008, he joined Envigado and was a top prospect for the club scoring 18 goals in 24 matches with the reserve team. His play while on the books of the Envigado reserve team helped him draw interest from Argentina's Quilmes. He joined Quilmes in 2009 and scored 13 goals in 19 appearances for the club.

On March 17, 2010, Montaño joined Seattle Sounders FC on loan from Quilmes.  He made his debut for the club in a 4-0 loss at home to the Los Angeles Galaxy. On March 14, 2011, Seattle announced that they had re-signed Montaño.

He was sent on loan to NASL club Montreal Impact on August 15, 2011. While on loan with Montreal he appeared in six league matches scoring one goal. Montaño impressed the club and on December 7, 2011 it was announced that he would be joining the club permanently during their inaugural season in Major League Soccer.

Montreal announced in December 2012 that Montaño would not return for the 2013 season.

In July 2014, Montaño rejoined his first professional club Quilmes in Argentine Primera División.

Miguel Montano joined Victoria Hotspurs after trials in the BOV Premier League in Malta during the summer months. Montano was very present throughout September in the first matches of the Gozo Championship 2015/2016.

On 28 January 2019, Victoria Hotspurs announced, that they had re-signed Miguel for the rest of the 2018/19 season. Migual had been away from the club since the end of the 2015/16 season, and had meanwhile been playing for Orsomarso in his home country.

International career
Montaño made his debut for the Colombia Under-20 national team in 2010.

Career statistics

Honors

Seattle Sounders FC
 Lamar Hunt U.S. Open Cup (2): 2010, 2011

Uniautónoma
 Categoría Primera B (1): 2013

References

External links
 
 

1991 births
Living people
People from Palmira, Valle del Cauca
Colombian footballers
Colombia under-20 international footballers
Colombian expatriate footballers
Quilmes Atlético Club footballers
Seattle Sounders FC players
Montreal Impact (1992–2011) players
CF Montréal players
Deportivo Cali footballers
Cúcuta Deportivo footballers
Uniautónoma F.C. footballers
Expatriate footballers in Argentina
Expatriate soccer players in the United States
Expatriate soccer players in Canada
Primera Nacional players
Categoría Primera A players
Categoría Primera B players
Major League Soccer players
North American Soccer League players
Association football midfielders
Sportspeople from Valle del Cauca Department